This article displays the qualifying draw for the men's singles at the 2016 Australian Open.

Draw

Seeds

Qualifiers

Lucky losers 
  Bjorn Fratangelo

Draw

First qualifier

Second qualifier

Third qualifier

Fourth qualifier

Fifth qualifier

Sixth qualifier

Seventh qualifier

Eighth qualifier

Ninth qualifier

Tenth qualifier

Eleventh qualifier

Twelfth qualifier

Thirteenth qualifier

Fourteenth qualifier

Fifteenth qualifier

Sixteenth qualifier

References
Qualifying Draw
 2016 Australian Open – Men's draws and results at the International Tennis Federation

Men's Singles Qualifying
Australian Open (tennis) by year – Qualifying